Boss Organ is an album by organist Charlie Earland which was recorded in 1966 and released on the Choice label in 1969.

Track listing
All compositions by Charles Earland except where noted
 "Danny Boy Soul" (Dave Paul) – 2:50
 "Millology" – 4:30
 "Six Twice" – 4:50
 "Mustang" – 5:05
 "Tonk" (Ray Bryant) – 5:45
 "Rock-a-Bye Your Baby" (Jean Schwartz, Sam M. Lewis, Joe Young) – 4:35
 "Wha's Happinin'" – 6:15

Personnel
Charles Earland – organ
Jimmy Ponder – guitar
Bobby Durham  – drums

References

Charles Earland albums
1969 albums
Albums produced by Ozzie Cadena
Albums recorded at Van Gelder Studio